Barış Eyriboz (born July 10, 1976 in Karadeniz Ereğli, Turkey) is a Turkish film director, screenwriter and producer.

Biography

Early life 
Barış Eyriboz was born in 1976 in Karadeniz Ereğli. After completing basic training in the city of birth, he studied Tourism Management at Akdeniz University.

Eyriboz was interested in the cinema from an early age, a large number of high school years writing about the art of cinema and theater information gained from the source and theoretical works. During this period, he began to write short stories and short film scripts. His university education in Antalya in 1999 continued, co-scripted and directed Bloklar (The Blocks) her with a short film, cinema, took the first step to life. This is the first film work, held in İzmir in 1999, Foça 1st Environmental Short Film Festival attended the same festival, The National Environmental Short Film Competition showed the success of the final exposure.

Period of professional cinema 
Short film experience, and college graduation, then moved to İstanbul in 2001. İstanbul early in life, organized and trained by various organizations, filmmakers and academics, workshops, panels, seminars and by participating as a film directing, cinematographic fiction and actor management issues periodically received training on the basic cinema.

Actively involved in professional cinema industry, director Naci Çelik Berksoy began as assistant to flour. During this period, the player on the management of cinema techniques and gained practical experience. Next process, and different levels within the industry and took on duties for various projects. Assistant director, production coordinator and director of the cast has undertaken this process duties.

Later in life, directing and producing, earning the status of Labirent Film was named one of the founders of the company. Eyriboz, cinema-television and advertising industry is still an active director, producer and screenwriter.

References

External links 
 
 
 Barış Eyriboz at SinemaTürk
 Barış Eyriboz at InterSinema

1976 births
Living people
Turkish film directors
Turkish male screenwriters
Turkish film producers
Akdeniz University alumni
People from Karadeniz Ereğli